Penne Hackforth-Jones (5 August 194917 May 2013) was an American-born Australian actress and biographer.

Early life
Penelope Beatrix Hackforth-Jones was born in August 1949 in Greenwich, Connecticut, to Paul and Susan Felicity (née Gullett) Hackforth-Jones and was a granddaughter of Sir Henry Gullett and niece of Jo Gullett, both Australian politicians. She lived with her family in England before relocating to Australia in 1964. After completing her secondary education at St Catherine's School, Toorak in 1966 she attended the National Institute of Dramatic Art in Sydney until graduating in 1968.

Career 

In 1969, Hackforth-Jones made her first credited on-screen appearance in the Australian television series Riptide. She later appeared in such Australian television series as Bellbird, Butterfly Island, Homicide, Matlock Police, Division 4, Cop Shop, Tandarra, Cash and Company, Young Ramsay, Punishment, Bellamy, A Country Practice, Mother and Son, Tanamera – Lion of Singapore, Murder Call, All Saints, Chandon Pictures, :30 Seconds and The Doctor Blake Mysteries. She also appeared in Episode 169 of Australian sitcom Hey Dad..!.

Her feature film roles included Dr. Sort in Alvin Purple (1973), the bridal shop manager in Muriel's Wedding (1994), Mrs Pike in Paradise Road (1997), Cynthia Dodds in Mao's Last Dancer (2009), and Mrs Johnson in The Tree (2010). She was featured in a long-running television advertisement series for Kellogg's Sultana Bran in the 1980s/90s.

Writing
Hackforth-Jones was the author of a biography of her great-grandmother, novelist Barbara Baynton, titled Barbara Baynton – Between Two Worlds.

Awards
In 1976 Hackforth-Jones won a Penguin and Sammy award for best actress in a series for her role as Jessica Johnson in Tandarra. She was nominated for best actress in a supporting role at the Australian Film Institute Awards in 1990 for her performance in Kokoda Crescent.

Death
Penne Hackforth-Jones died of lung cancer on 17 May 2013, aged 63, in Melbourne. She never married, and was survived by her three sisters. The Daily Telegraph featured an article on Hackforth-Jones in its history section on 21 May.

Filmography

FILM

TELEVISION

References

External links
 
Penne Hackforth-Jones in film clips at Australian Screen: Alvin Purple  Last Breakfast in Paradise  Chandon Pictures

1949 births
2013 deaths
American emigrants to Australia
Australian biographers
Australian film actresses
Australian television actresses
Deaths from lung cancer
Deaths from cancer in Victoria (Australia)
National Institute of Dramatic Art alumni
American people of Australian descent
Australian women writers
Actresses from Greenwich, Connecticut
Writers from Greenwich, Connecticut
Women biographers
21st-century American women
American people of English descent
Australian people of English descent
Australian people of Irish descent
American people of Irish descent
People educated at St Catherine's School, Melbourne